The American News is a newspaper in Aberdeen, South Dakota, published by Gannett of McLean, Virginia.
It is published four days a week, Tuesday through Friday.

History 
The Aberdeen News was founded as a weekly in 1885 by C.W. Starling and Paul Ware. Soon after, the Ordway Tribune, which had a power press, was moved to Aberdeen and combined with the News to produce a daily. In 1920, a competitor, the Aberdeen American, bought the News, and both were later purchased by the Aberdeen Journal. The Ridder family purchased the papers in 1928. The newspaper became The American News in 2004.

In June 2006, The American News merged with McClatchy and was subsequently purchased by Schurz Communications. On July 13, 2010, The American News named Cory Bollinger as publisher after the death of publisher David Leone. In October, 2010, executive editor Cindy Eikamp retired after 21 years at that position.  She was replaced by J.J. Perry. In January 2019, Schurz sold the paper to GateHouse Media.

Aberdeen News Company also publishes a weekly farming publication called the Farm Forum that goes to 18,000 households in 5 states.  It is also available online.

Market 
Aberdeen is three hours from Fargo, North Dakota, and Sioux Falls, South Dakota, and about five hours from Minneapolis–Saint Paul. The market area, known as the Dakota Midland, is based primarily on agriculture. Hundreds of family-owned farms and small communities dot the Northern Plains. Aberdeen is the largest community within a  radius.

References

External links
 Aberdeen News 
 Farm Forum

Newspapers published in South Dakota
Aberdeen, South Dakota
Publications established in 1885
Gannett publications